(fl. 936–966) was a Japanese poet of the Heian period. She was also a lady-in-waiting of Lady Onshi, consort of Emperor Daigo.

Background
She belonged to the Fujiwara clan. Her father was Fujiwara no Suenawa, the right lesser captain (Japanese: Ukon no Shosho).

Life
She was active as a great poet for 30 years. In 933 she composed the poem for the coming-of-age celebration of Princess Koshi. In 960 and 962 she took part in a poetry contests of the court. In 966 she took part in a poetry contest held at the garden of the court. She exchanged poems with Prince Motoyoshi, Fujiwara no Atsutada, Fujiwara no Morosuke, Fujiwara no Morouji, Fujiwara no Asatada and Minamoto no Shitagō. Her name was included in the list of Thirty-six Female Poetry Immortals.

Work
Her poems are included in the anthologies Hyakunin Isshu, Gosen Wakashū, and others.

Here is Poem No.38 from Hyakunin Isshu:

The Lady Ukon is supposed to have been deserted by her husband, and in this poem she regrets, not so much her own sorrow, as the fact that he has broken his sworn oath, and is therefore in danger of divine vengeance.

References 
 Peter McMillan (2008) One hundred poets, one poem each: a translation of the Ogura Hyakunin Isshu. New York: Columbia University Press.

External links 
 Poems of Ukon (in Japanese)
 A Hundred Verses from Old Japan (The Hyakunin-isshu), tr. by William N. Porter, 1909, at sacred-texts.com

10th-century Japanese women writers
10th-century writers
Articles containing Japanese poems
10th-century Japanese poets
Japanese women poets
Hyakunin Isshu poets